Seppo Aho (born 7 March 1944) is a Finnish modern pentathlete. He competed at the 1968 Summer Olympics. At the 1968 Olympics he finished 18th in the individual event and 5th in the team event.

References

External links
 

1944 births
Living people
Finnish male modern pentathletes
Olympic modern pentathletes of Finland
Modern pentathletes at the 1968 Summer Olympics
People from Pornainen
Sportspeople from Uusimaa